John Miller Gray (1850-1894) was a Scottish art critic and the first curator of the Scottish National Portrait Gallery.

He was born on 19 July 1850 in Edinburgh, his father a shawl manufacturer who was bankrupted in 1857, his mother dying at his birth. He attended Mr Munro's school in Newington, but was forced aged 16 to finish his education and take up work as an apprentice bank clerk at the Bank of Scotland, where he remained for 18 years. Although he detested the work, in his spare time he educated himself about art and worked as a critic. He was particularly influenced by the art critic and writer Walter Pater, with whom he corresponded as well as reviewing some of Pater's work including Marius the Epicurean.

Gray was friendly with a number of prominent artists and public figures, including artists William Bell Scott and Phoebe Anna Traquair, and physician and writer John Brown. In 1884 he was appointed first curator of the new Scottish National Portrait Gallery, initially at temporary premises and later in Robert Rowand Anderson's Queen Street building, which opened in 1889.

He wrote regularly for periodicals including Academy and the Edinburgh Evening Courant and was chief art critic of the Scottish Leader. His publications included an 1880 book on Scottish artist George Manson and several essays on the iconography of Robert Burns. His two-volume Memoir and Remains was posthumously published by David Douglas in Edinburgh in 1895.

He died on 22 March 1894 of a brain haemorrhage, shortly before his 44th birthday, and was buried at Echo Bank cemetery in Newington, Edinburgh. He left most of his estate to the Gallery.

A portrait of him by Patrick William Adam is in the collection of the Scottish National Portrait Gallery.

References

1850 births
1894 deaths
Scottish art critics
Writers from Edinburgh